Pollia wagneri is a species of sea snail, a marine gastropod mollusk in the family Pisaniidae.

Description
The length of the shell attains 20.7 mm.

Distribution
This marine species occurs off Indonesia.

References

 Hombron, J. B. & Jacquinot, H. (1848) Atlas d’Histoire Naturelle. Zoologie par MM. Hombron et Jacquinot, chirurgiens de l’expédition. in: Voyage au Pole Sud et dans l’Océanie sur les corvettes l’Astrolabe et la Zélée exécuté par ordre du roi pendant les années 1837-1838-1839-1840 sous le commandement de M. Dumont-D’Urville capitaine de vaisseau publié sous les auspices du département de la marine et sous la direction supérieure de M. Jacquinot, capitaine de Vaisseau, commandant de la Zélée. 26ème livraison: pls 17, 21, 23, 24, 25. page(s): pl. 25 figs 30–31
In: Voyage au Pôle Sud et dans l'Océanie sur les corvettes l'Astrolabe et la Zélée, Zoologie, vol. 5, p. 1-118, 125-131 (Mollusques); 119-124, 131-132 (Zoophytes)
 Drivas, J.; Jay, M. (1987). Coquillages de La Réunion et de l'Île Maurice. Collection Les Beautés de la Nature. Delachaux et Niestlé: Neuchâtel. . 159 pp

External links
 Snyder M.A. (2003). Catalogue of the marine gastropod family Fasciolariidae. Academy of Natural Sciences. of Philadelphia, Special Publication. 21iii + 1–431
 Küster, H. C. & Kobelt, W. (1844-1876). Die geschwäntzen unbewehrten Purpurschnecken. Erste Hälfte: Turbinella und Fasciolaria. In Abbildungen nach der Natur mit Beschreibungen. Mollusca Gasteropoda: Purpuracea: Purpurschnecken; Dritte Abtheilung. Systematisches Conchylien-Cabinet von Martini und Chemnitz, ed.2, 3(3[1): 1-164, pls. 1-31, 9a, 9b, 13b, 14[a], 41, 42. Published in parts: pp. 1-40, pls 1-6, 11]

Pisaniidae
Gastropods described in 1839